Astrothelium sanguineoxanthum is a species of corticolous (bark-dwelling), crustose lichen in the family Trypetheliaceae. Found in Brazil, it was formally described as a new species in 2016 by Dutch lichenologist André Aptroot. The type specimen was collected in 1894 by Swedish botanist Gustaf Oskar Andersson Malme in Santa Anna da Chapada (Mato Grosso); there, it was found in a rainforest growing on smooth tree bark. The lichen has a smooth, green to greyish thallus with whitish pseudostromata that range in shape from rounded to irregular to elongated. The thallus contains the lichen products isohypocrellin and lichexanthone; the latter substance causes the thallus and pseudostroma to fluoresce yellow when lit with a long-wavelength UV light, while the pigment isohypocrellin causes a K+ (green) chemical spot test reaction. The combination of characteristics of the lichen that distinguish it from others in Astrothelium are its ascospores, which turn violet in iodine potassium iodide (IKI) stain; and the arrangement and form of its ascomata, which are solitary to irregularly confluent,  to prominent, and are whitish around the ostioles.

References

sanguineoxanthum
Lichen species
Lichens described in 2016
Lichens of Brazil
Taxa named by André Aptroot